The 1980 Omloop Het Volk was the 35th edition of the Omloop Het Volk cycle race and was held on 1 March 1980. The race started and finished in Ghent. The race was won by Joseph Bruyère.

General classification

References

1980
Omloop Het Nieuwsblad
Omloop Het Nieuwsblad
March 1980 sports events in Europe